Port Charlotte may refer to the following places:

 Port Charlotte, Islay, Argyll and Bute, Scotland
 Port Charlotte distillery
 Port Charlotte, Florida, United States
 Port Charlotte High School